The Cheng Hua Athletic Association whose football team were known as the Cheng Hua Tigers is a sports club in the Philippines. They are an associate member of the Cavite Football Association and a member of the  Federation of School Sports Association of the Philippines.

History
Cheng Hua was established in 1932 as a result of a merger between Shin Cheng and Tong Hua, both local-based Chinese teams. The two sports group decided to use a Chinese character from each of their names to form the name "Cheng Hua", which literally means "unification of Chinese teams overseas".

In 2007 at the gala dedicated to the centennial of football in the Philippines, Cheng Hua along with Blue Guards and the Manila Nomads received awards in the team category for their contribution in Philippine football.

From the year of their inception until the 1980s, their football team competed and won in various domestic and international competitions. Cheng Hua also accommodated other sports such as basketball, badminton, golf, table tennis, and tennis. The sports club remain extant as of 2016.

See also
Manila Lions F.C.

References

Association football clubs established in 1932
Football clubs in the Philippines
1932 establishments in the Philippines